Dick John Kink (September 2, 1921 – August 29, 1971) was an American politician in the state of Washington. He served in the Washington House of Representatives from 1957 to 1971.

References

1971 deaths
1921 births
Politicians from Bellingham, Washington
Democratic Party members of the Washington House of Representatives
20th-century American politicians